Miss Guided is an American sitcom that ran from March 18, 2008, to April 3, 2008, as a mid-season replacement on ABC. The series follows the life of Becky Freeley, a guidance counselor at a high school that she attended when she was a teenager. The pilot was directed by Todd Holland. The series was not renewed for a second season.

Cast and characters
 Judy Greer – Rebecca "Becky" Freeley, Guidance Counselor at Glen Ellen High School. She previously attended the school as a student, and was in the same graduating class as Lisa. She was unpopular in High School, her sole activity being one of only two members of the Milli Vanilli club. She does not have much of a social life, and still lives with her mom. She has a crush on Tim.
 Earl Billings – Phil Huffy, Principal of the school. He hired Becky mainly because she is a lot prettier than he remembers her in High School. He has an apathetic attitude toward his work.
 Brooke Burns – Lisa Germain, English teacher and cheerleading coach. Lisa is a new addition to the school but like Becky she also attended the school as a student, graduating in the same class as Becky and being crowned Homecoming Queen and was a cheerleader. She was married to a man called Jay, but they are currently separated. She is also the target of Vice Principal Bruce Terry's affections but she has no feelings whatsoever for him, while she is seen as Becky's rival for the affections of fellow teacher Tim O'Malley.
 Kristoffer Polaha – Tim O'Malley, Remedial Spanish teacher. Previously taught Auto-Shop at the school, before a vacancy led him to move to the Spanish department despite having only basic knowledge of the language. He is noted for having good hair and being the object of both Becky and Lisa's affections. Is two credits short of holding a College Diploma, but no one else at the school knows.
 Chris Parnell – Bruce Terry, Vice Principal of the school. Has been at the school for at least 11 years, teaching both Becky and Lisa in their school days. He likes to think of himself as an authoritative masculine figure, although it is hinted that he has tendencies that might lead people to believe that he is gay. He has already set his sights on going after both the Principal's job and Lisa, who wants nothing to do with him. The episode "Frenemies" showed that he greatly admires Vice President Dick Cheney.

The show has featured a number of guest stars, most notably Executive Producer Ashton Kutcher guest starred in the second episode as substitute teacher Beaux alongside Zoey 101 star Jamie Lynn Spears as a student, and Rumer Willis as a rebellious student.

Episodes

Production
Caroline Williams penned the script for the show, originally called Miss/Guided, which was then developed by Katalyst Films, Ashton Kutcher's Studio at 20th Century Fox Television. The ABC network then ordered the pilot to be made in August 2006.

After the pilot was shot ABC ordered the show to series on 13 May 2007  ordering an additional six episodes two days before its formal upfront presentation for the fall television season. At the upfronts the show wasn't given any formal timeslot, instead being held by the network for a mid-season debut. The show completed all of its original 7 episode order prior to the 2007–2008 Writers Guild of America strike. Prior to its first airing the shows title was changed to Miss Guided, losing the '/' from its original title.

Casting
In October 2006, Judy Greer was cast in the lead role of Becky. This was soon followed by Brooke Burns as Lisa, Kristoffer Polaha as Tim, Earl Billings as Principal Huffy and Jonathan Sadowski as Gary, the school's male nurse.

Following the changes to the show runners, Chris Parnell was cast as a regular in the show as Bruce, originally planned to be a rival Guidance Counselor to Becky. The character was then changed to the Vice Principal of the school, while Jonathan Sadowski was let go from his role of Gary.

Crew
Gabrielle Allen (Scrubs) was hired as the original show runner with Todd Holland committed to direct the pilot. Kutcher, Jason Goldberg and Karey Burke would serve as the shows executive producers alongside Holland and Allen. Creator Caroline Williams would serve as Co-Executive Producer.

In June 2007, Gabrielle Allen left her production role and Rob Thomas was announced as the new Show Runner of the series  but left the show after only a few weeks due to creative differences over the show's tone. He was replaced by Mark Hudis, who previously worked as the show runner on That '70s Show. Hudis is credited as Executive Producer from the second episode onward.

Crew members included:
Kevin Etten
Mark Hudis
Victor Hsu
Karey Burke
Todd Holland
Ashton Kutcher
Caroline Williams
Barbara Feldman
Jason Goldberg
David Walpert
Joel Goldberg
Gabrielle Allan

Broadcasting
The show debuted Tuesday March 18, 2008 at 10:30PM EST following an extended Dancing With the Stars. The show subsequently moved to its regular time slot of Thursday 8PM EST on March 20, 2008, where back to back episodes air for the whole hour.

Reception

Critical response
The show received a 63 out of 100 on Metacritic, indicating "generally favorable reviews", with the most positive review coming from Entertainment Weekly saying "MG is wonderfully absurd and the supporting cast is satisfyingly straight-faced" [21 Mar 2008, p. 53] while the most negative review from Variety said "Beyond Greer's latter-day Mary Tyler Moore shtick, there's not a note or character that doesn't feel warmed over."

U.S. Nielsen ratings

References

External links
 

2000s American high school television series
2000s American single-camera sitcoms
2000s American workplace comedy television series
2008 American television series debuts
2008 American television series endings
American Broadcasting Company original programming
English-language television shows
Television series by 20th Century Fox Television